NGC may refer to:

Companies
 NGC Corporation, name of US electric company Dynegy, Inc. from 1995 to 1998
 National Gas Company of Trinidad and Tobago, state-owned natural gas company in Trinidad and Tobago
 National Grid plc, a former name of National Grid Electricity Transmission plc, the operator of the British electricity transmission system
 Northrop Grumman Corporation, aerospace and defense conglomerate formed from the merger of Northrop Corporation and Grumman Corporation in 1994
 Numismatic Guaranty Corporation, coin certification company in the United States

Other uses
 National Gallery of Canada, art gallery founded in 1880 in Ottawa, Canada
 National Geographic, documentary and reality television channel established in the United States in 2001 formerly called National Geographic Channel
 Native Girls Code, US non-profit organisation that teaches computer programming and indigenous knowledge to Native American girls
 Nevada Gaming Commission, regulator of gaming in the U.S. state of Nevada
 New General Catalogue of Nebulae and Clusters of Stars, a catalogue of deep sky objects in astronomy
 New Graduate College, graduate college at Princeton University
 Nintendo GameCube, sixth-generation video game console first marketed by Nintendo in 2001
 NGC Magazine, Nintendo enthusiast magazine in the United Kingdom; formerly called N64 Magazine
 North German Confederation, German federal state that succeeded the German Confederation in 1867
 Pearland NGC
 Carmiooro NGC, professional cycling team first registered in 2008
 National Glass Centre, glass-making workshop in North East England, since converted into a visitor attraction at the University of Sunderland
 NVIDIA GPU Cloud (NGC)
 National Green Corps, is a major initiative of MOEFCC for creating environmental awareness launched in 2001-02 which aims at building cadres of young children working towards environmental conservation and sustainable development.
 Next Generation Core  of 5G technology